Petroleuciscus smyrnaeus, also known as the Izmir chub or Smyrna chub, is a species of ray-finned fish in the family Cyprinidae.
It is found in Greece and Turkey.
Its natural habitat is rivers.
It is threatened by habitat loss.

References

Petroleuciscus
Fish described in 1896
Taxonomy articles created by Polbot